This Side of Jordan is the third studio album by North Carolina folk duo Mandolin Orange, currently known as Watchhouse. Released on August 19, 2013 through Yep Roc Records, it is their first record released on the Yep Roc Records label.

Personnel

Andrew Marlin – vocals, mandolin, acoustic guitar, organ (on "Cavalry"), bass (on "Waltz About Whiskey")
Emily Frantz – vocals, violin, acoustic guitar
Ryan Gustafson – electric guitar (on "Morphine Girl")

Track listing

References

2013 albums
Yep Roc Records albums
Watchhouse albums